Marie-Kristin Schmid (born 15 December 1996) is a German ice hockey player for ERC Ingolstadt and the German national team.

She represented Germany at the 2019 IIHF Women's World Championship.

References

External links

1996 births
Living people
German women's ice hockey forwards
Sportspeople from Garmisch-Partenkirchen